Kitty Coleman Provincial Park, also known as Kitty Coleman Beach Provincial Park, is a Class C provincial park located in British Columbia, Canada. It is located on Vancouver Island, in the Comox Valley, south of the mouth of the Oyster River just northeast of Courtenay.  

Unlike most provincial parks, it is a Class 'C' provincial park, meaning it is run by a local community board. The beach is directly across from the sites and provides views of Powell River and the surrounding beaches across the water. There are only pit toilets available, and no hook-up or sani-station for motorhomes.  It is approximately 0.1 km2 in area.

History
The park was established on November 14, 1944 and was named after Kitty Coleman, a local First Nation member who left her tribe early to marry a white man.

Flora and fauna
There are very tall Douglas Fir trees in the southern area. Wild onions also grow in the park.

References

External links
BC Parks infopage

Mid Vancouver Island
Provincial parks of British Columbia
1944 establishments in British Columbia
Protected areas established in 1944